Cryoturris albida is a species of sea snail, a marine gastropod mollusk in the family Mangeliidae.

Description

Distribution
This marine species can be found off Jamaica

References

External links
 Worldwide Molluscs Species Data Base: Cryoturris albida

albida